Edward Marjoribanks may refer to:

 Edward Marjoribanks, 2nd Baron Tweedmouth (1849–1909), British Liberal Party politician, MP 1880–1894, held senior posts in several liberal governments 
 Edward Marjoribanks (Conservative politician) (1900–1932), British Conservative Member of Parliament for Eastbourne 1929–1932